HMS Zenobia was a schooner of the Adonis class of the Royal Navy during the Napoleonic War. She was built and completed at Bermuda using Bermuda cedar in 1806 and commissioned under Lieutenant Archibald Hamilton. She sailed for Norfolk, Virginia, on 22 October 1806. 

On 29 October 1806, she sighted the American coast and a pilot came aboard. Despite the assistance from the shore and several Royal Navy vessels, Hamilton was unable to refloat her. The desertion to shore of 18 of her 24-man crew did not help. Hamilton and his remaining crew abandoned the wreck on 6 December 1806.

Postscript
Zenobias deserters helped provoke what became known as the Chesapeake-Leopard Affair. On 22 June 1807, the Royal Navy fourth rate  pursued, attacked, and boarded the United States Navy frigate  looking for deserters from the Royal Navy, including those from Zenobia.

Citations and references
Citations

References
 
 
 
  

 

Adonis-class schooners
1806 ships
Ships built in Bermuda
Maritime incidents in 1806
Shipwrecks of the Virginia coast
Maritime incidents in 1807